La Muerte Viva! is The Bronx's second EP and the first recording on Wichita Records, released on November 15, 2003. The EP was only largely released both in Europe and Australia and being limited edition has since become somewhat of a collectors item.

Track listing
 All tracks by The Bronx, except "Private Affair" written by The Saints

The Australian version was printed with the track names in the wrong order on the case as well as in the booklet. On the actual CD "Private Affair" is Track 4 instead of Track 6, "Bats" is Track 5 instead of Track 4 and "You want to see us burn" is Track 6 instead of Track 5. The track listing above matches the order on the CD.
The booklet is folded differently from the U.K. Version.

Personnel
 Jorma Vik - drums
 Matt Caughthran - vocals
 Joby J. Ford - Guitar
 James Tweedy - Bass

2003 EPs
The Bronx (band) EPs
Shock Records EPs
Wichita Recordings EPs